Anna Pammrová (29 June 1860, Kralice nad Oslavou – 19 September 1945, Žďárec) was a Czech writer, feminist and philosopher. She had a difficult personal life with an unhappy childhood and marriage. After her divorce, she lived in poverty in a forest with her two children. Her daughter died and her son escaped and did not return. She survived with the help of her friends. Throughout her life she corresponded with her friend Otokar Březina who she met in Jinošov in 1887 and their letters resurfaced in 2008. Her autobiographical fragmentary novel 'Antieva' was published posthumously in 1997.

Bibliography
 Alfa. Embryonální pokus o řešení ženské otázky, 1917
 O mateřství a pamateřství, 1919
 Cestou k zářnému cíli, 1925
 Zápisky nečitelné, 1936
 Odezva z lůna stvoření, 1937
 Mé vzpomínky na Otokara Březinu, 1940
 Zrcadlo duše, ed. J. Vitula, 1945
 Žena s duší lesa (výběr z dopisů A. P. Leonoře Pammrové-Pohorské), ed. L. Kuchař. 1970
 Dopisy A. P. rodině Havlových, před. I. M. Havel, SI 1982
 Antieva, Společnost Anny Pammrové, 1997

1860 births
1945 deaths
20th-century Czech women writers
Czech feminists
20th-century Czech philosophers
Czech women philosophers
People from Třebíč District